This list is of the Places of Scenic Beauty of Japan located within the Prefecture of Kōchi.

National Places of Scenic Beauty
As of 1 September 2019, three Places have been designated at a national level.

Prefectural Places of Scenic Beauty
As of 1 May 2019, seven Places have been designated at a prefectural level.

Municipal Places of Scenic Beauty
As of 1 May 2019, thirteen Places have been designated at a municipal level.

See also
 Cultural Properties of Japan
 List of Historic Sites of Japan (Kōchi)
 List of parks and gardens of Kōchi Prefecture

References

External links
  Cultural Properties of Kōchi Prefecture
  National Places of Scenic Beauty of Kōchi Prefecture
  Prefectural Places of Scenic Beauty of Kōchi Prefecture

Tourist attractions in Kōchi Prefecture
Places of Scenic Beauty